This article lists the current and former political parties in East Timor. East Timor is a democratic, multi-party state. The Indonesian parties that were represented in the country during the occupation period (1975-1999) are not listed. Official registration and admission of a party takes place at the East Timor Supreme Court of Justice. This requires the signatures of 20,000 supporters, with 1000 signatures from each municipalities.

Parties

Parliamentary parties
Eight parties currently hold seats in the National Parliament:

Unrepresented parties

Defunct and unregistered parties

Partido Timor Forte (PARTIFOR) is currently striving for registration, but as of January 2021 has not yet met all the requirements. The Party leader is Gregório Saldanha. The same applies to the Partidu Dezenvolvementu Sosiál (PDS). The application was rejected by FITUN in January 2021.

Party alliances 
This list compiles the party alliances (coalitions) in Timor Leste with their own respective names, founding, member parties, and flags.

Election results

References

External links

 Pat Walsh: East Timor's Political Parties and Groupings Briefing Notes, Australian Council for Overseas Aid 2001 (MS Word; 174 kB)
  (PDF; 996 kB)
 
 Dennis Shoesmith: Party Systems and Factionalism in Timor-Leste, 2020.
 Lurdes Silva-Carneiro de Sousa:  (RTF; 199 kB)
 Political Parties and Groupings of Timor Leste, ALP International Projects Group, 2007.
 Political Parties in the Pacific Islands, Australian National University, 2008

East Timor
 
Political parties
East Timor
Political parties